Whisper With the Wind, is a 2009 Iranian drama film directed by Shahram Alidi in his first film.

Plot
In the years of military asphyxia in dictatorial regime of Saddam, in a very bad situation that everything was under the regime's control, people find any available way to keep in touch together. An old man is the post-man in a wide area of Kurdistan Iraq. His job is to deliver people's messages but not written one, but oral messages. He is an oral post-man and records and sells the messages of the folk and gets income in this way.

Cast
 Omar Chawshin: Mam Baldar
 Maryam Boubani: Mam Boldar's wife
 Fakhr Mohammad Barzani: Kak Shamal
 Valid Marouf Jarou: Radio announcer
 Mohara, Hossein Ghadr: Radio serviceman
 Bistoun Ali Ghadr: Deserting soldier

Crew
 Director: Shahram Alidi
 Screenplay: Shahram Alidi
 Editing: Hayedeh Safiyari
 Sound recorder: Asghar Abgoun
 Sound mixer:Mohammad-Reza Delpak
 Set designer: Shahram Alidi
 Make-up: Sudabeh Khosravi
 Producer: Kurdistan regional government, Ministry of Culture
 Co producer: Ro Oguz
 Producer: Taw Film, Shahram Alidi
 French Partner: Dream Lab Films, Nasrine Medard de Chardon

Awards
 Cannes International Film Festival- France- Critic Weeks Section- 2009- Competitor for Golden Camera- Three Prizes: 
 The Best Feature Film's ACID support
 Prize of View of Youth
 Prize of Young European Critics
 Mumbai International Film Festival- Prize of Mumbai Young Critics Award- India- 2009
 Amazon Film Festival- Special Jury Award- Brazil- 2009
 Pessac International Historic Film Festival- Prize of Academic Jury- France- 2009
 Student Academy Awards of Bratislava- Bratislava Film festival- Slovak- 2009

References

External links

Whisper With The Wind Rottentomatoes
Whisper With The Wind Cinenews
Whisper With The Wind France24
Whisper With The Wind Urbandistrib

Films directed by Shahram Alidi
Iranian drama films
Kurdish films
Kurdish-language films
Films set in Iran